The Prince Theater is a non-profit theatrical producing organization located in Philadelphia, Pennsylvania and specializing in music theatre, including opera, music drama, musical comedy and experimental forms. Founded in 1984 as the American Music Theater Festival by Marjorie Samoff, Eric Salzman and Ron Kaiserman, for the first 15 years AMTF performed in various venues throughout Philadelphia. In March 1999, AMTF moved into the renovated Midtown Theater and changed its name in honor of Broadway producer and director Harold Prince,. AMTF/Prince Theater has produced 92 world premieres and has sent 81 productions to theaters in New York and worldwide.

Works
The Prince Theater productions (primarily as the American Music Theater Festival) have included the world premieres of
 Julie Taymor, Elliot Goldenthal and Sidney Goldfarb's The Transposed Heads
 Anthony Davis' X, The Life and Times of Malcolm X
 Duke Ellington's Queenie Pie
 Emily Mann, Ntozake Shange, and Baikida Carroll's Betsy Brown
 Bob Telson and Lee Breuer's Gospel at Colonus
 David Henry Hwang, Philip Glass and Jerome Sirlin's 1000 Airplanes on the Roof
 Frida, composed by Robert Xavier Rodriguez, libretto by Hillary Blecher and Migdalia Cruz
 Black Water by John Duffy and Joyce Carol Oates, based on her 1992 novel
 Adam Guettel and Tina Landau's Floyd Collins
 Philip Glass' Hydrogen Jukebox (concert version)  - a staged version appeared later at the Spoleto Festival
 Harry Partch's Revelation in the Courthouse Park, staged by Jiri Zizka with choreography by George Faison
 Harold Prince's 3hree,  a trilogy of one-acts with music by John Bucchino, Robert Lindsey Nassif and Laurence O'Keefe
 Chasing Nicolette by Peter Kellogg and David Friedman
 Albert Innaurato's Gemini, The Musical, with music by Charlie Gilbert
 The Green Violin

Revivals have included Strike Up the Band, Love Life, St. Louis Woman, Pal Joey, Lady in the Dark, Adam Guettel's Myths & Hymns, Dreamgirls, Annie Get Your Gun, Hair and Ain't Misbehavin'.

Reviews
Notable press has included...
 "The foremost presenter of new and adventurous music theater works in the country." TIME Magazine
 "Philadelphia's Premiere Factory." The Washington Post
 "Floyd Collins... has large ambitions, and lives up to them." The New York Times
 "Long Live The Prince!" The Philadelphia Inquirer
 "Hey, They Do Write 'Em Like They Used To... Everything old can seem new again...  That is the delightful lesson of 3hree...presented in a snappily renovated former movie house, the Prince Theater." The New York Times
 "Spotlighting emerging musical theater artists, 3hree demonstrates that even the most talented among us need a place to begin, to wrestle with a complex, collaborative art form in manageable pieces.  The show... lifts off and soars... inspiring great hope for the future of the American musical." Variety
 "Enterprising and ambitious productions" Philadelphia City Paper
 "Once in a great while, it happens in the theater that someone extends an arm into the heavens and, to our amazement, snatches down a lightning bolt.  It happened last week with Revelation in the Courthouse Park, the orgy musical that capped the American Music Theater Festival's fourth annual season. With an astonishing concentration of theatrical forces, the production, which hit with earthquake force... renewed the festival's franchise on a certain kind of excitement in this town." The Philadelphia Inquirer

References

External links
 website of the Philadelphia Film Center, formerly the Prince Theater

Theatres in Philadelphia
Musical theatre companies
Rittenhouse Square, Philadelphia
Musical groups established in 1984
1984 establishments in Pennsylvania